The Kowsar Women Football League (Lig-e Kâuser-e Banuan-e Futbal-e Iran) is a women's football league, run by the Football Federation Islamic Republic of Iran. At the top of the Iranian football league system, it is the country's primary competition for the sport. It was established in 2007.

Seasons

Current clubs 2020-21

Champions

See also
 AFC Women's Club Championship
 Women's football in Iran
 Iran Football League Organization
 Esteghlal Women F.C.

References

External links
 Iran Football League Organization official website

Iran
women
2008 establishments in Iran
Sports leagues established in 2008
Women's sports leagues in Iran